Siamanthus is a genus of plants in the ginger family, Zingiberaceae. It contains only one known species, Siamanthus siliquosus, endemic to Thailand and first described in 1998.

References

Alpinioideae
Endemic flora of Thailand
Monotypic Zingiberales genera
Zingiberaceae genera